Prowler is a wooden roller coaster located at Worlds of Fun in Kansas City, Missouri. Manufactured by Great Coasters International, the $8-million ride opened to the public on May 2, 2009.

History
Before the announcement of the new ride, there were teasers put out by the park. These teasers included placing a mysterious large storage crate at the front of the park, which was 'delivered' by the "International Wildlife Organization" or the "IWO". More details of the package kept coming out through the blog and videos came out  as the IWO storyline continued until September 1, 2008. That day, Worlds of Fun announced that Prowler would be coming to the park.

Prowler opened to the general public on May 2, 2009.

For the 2019 season, both Prowler and Timber Wolf were retracked. Some sections had their wood replaced, including the first drop. The wood on the outside section of the hill was being replaced with IPE wood, which was the highest quality timber available and eight times harder than California Redwood. This would add some softness to the turn and reduce the stress on the track. Plus, the ride received a new chain for the lift hill.

The ride
Prowler is the second wooden roller coaster to be built at Worlds of Fun with the first one being Timber Wolf. The ride reaches an unspecified height of 85 feet, into a spiral drop which swoops into a ravine and through the woods at the top speed of 51 MPH. The ride is located in the Africa section of the park behind the Zulu Ride. Prowler has an estimated capacity of 850 riders per hour. It is the third ride to occupy that current spot at the park that the ride is operating in; originally home to the Safari Adventure and the Python Plunge (later renamed The Plunge). The lot was vacant from the Plunge's close in 1999 to the Prowler's opening in 2009.
The ride's layout (darting in and out of the woods) and promotional material (logo and tagline) makes reference to the famous wooden coaster The Beast at Kings Island, another Cedar Fair park near Cincinnati, Ohio.

Trains
Two "Millennium Flyer trains" with 12 cars per train. Riders are arranged two across in a single row for a total of 24 riders per train.

Rankings

Prowler was voted Best New Ride of 2009 - Amusement Park in Amusement Today's Golden Ticket Awards.

Gallery

References

External links

Prowler at Worlds of Fun's website

Roller coasters in Missouri
Roller coasters introduced in 2009
Worlds of Fun
Roller coasters operated by Cedar Fair
Best New Ride winners